Formed in 1998, SCI Fidelity Records is an independent record label based in Boulder, Colorado. It is owned and managed by the jam band The String Cheese Incident.

Artists
SCI Fidelity artists include Keller Williams, Umphrey's McGee, The Disco Biscuits, Railroad Earth, Younger Brother, Lotus, The Infamous Stringdusters, EOTO, Emmitt-Nershi Band, Kyle Hollingsworth, The New Deal, The Greyboy Allstars, 30db, Tea Leaf Green, The Radiators, Steve Kimock Band,  Brothers Past, New Monsoon and DJ Harry.

Staff
Kevin Morris - Consigliere

Matt Hogan - General Manager

Allie Hamby - Project Manager

Dave Hearn - Digital & Grassroots Marketing

Larry Fox - OTR Project Manager

Carrie Lombardi - Publicity

JD Tulloch - Daily Operations

References

External links
 Official site

American independent record labels
Companies based in Boulder, Colorado
Alternative rock record labels
Bluegrass record labels